Mata Grande is a municipality located at the north-western corner of the Brazilian state of Alagoas.

Its population is 25,207 (2020) and its area is 908 km².

See also
 List of municipalities in Alagoas

References

Municipalities in Alagoas